Super Hits is a compilation album by The Charlie Daniels Band released on May 31, 1994. It was re-released in 2007.
Super Hits was certified 2× Platinum by the RIAA for sales of 2 million copies.

Track listing

Critical reception

Stephen Thomas Erlewine of Allmusic concludes that the album is "entertaining" but "leaves you wanting more."

Charts

Weekly charts

Year-end charts

Certifications

References

Charlie Daniels albums
1994 greatest hits albums
Epic Records compilation albums